Cycas zeylanica, common name (in Sri Lanka) maha-madu is a plant apparently at present endemic to the Andaman and Nicobar Islands. It was formerly also present in Sri Lanka, but the last remnants of the populations there were destroyed by the tsunami of December 2004.

Cycas zeylanica is an unbranched shrub up to 3 m tall. Leaves are up to 200 cm long, green, glossy, pinnately compound with up to 100 leaflets. Pollen-producing cones fusiform (tapering at both ends), microsporophylls (male, pollen-producing) up to 45 mm long. Megasporophylls (female, ovule-producing) up to 30 cm long, each with 2-5 ovules. Seeds flattened to ovoid, orange-brown.

References

zeylanica
Flora of the Andaman Islands
Flora of the Nicobar Islands
Flora of Sri Lanka
Vulnerable flora of Asia
2004 Indian Ocean earthquake and tsunami